McASP is an acronym for Multichannel Audio Serial Port, a communication peripheral found in Texas Instruments family of digital signal processors (DSPs) and Microcontroller Units (MCUs).
The McASP functions as a general-purpose audio serial port optimized for the needs of multichannel audio applications.
Depending on the implementation, the McASP may be useful for time-division multiplexed (TDM) stream, Inter-Integrated Sound (I2S) protocols, and intercomponent digital audio interface transmission (DIT). However, some implementations are limited to supporting just the Inter-Integrated Sound (I2S) protocol.
The McASP consists of transmit and receive sections that may operate synchronized,
or completely independently with separate master clocks, bit clocks, and frame syncs,
and using different transmit modes with different bit-stream formats. The McASP
module also includes up to 16 serializers that can be individually enabled to either
transmit or receive. In addition, all of the McASP pins can be configured as
general-purpose input/output (GPIO) pins.

Features 

Features of the McASP include:
Two independent clock generator modules for transmit and receive
Clocking flexibility allows the McASP to receive and transmit at different rates. For example, the McASP can receive data at 48 kHz but output up-sampled data at 96 kHz or 192 kHz.
Independent transmit and receive modules, each includes:
Programmable clock and frame sync generator
TDM streams from 2 to 32, and 384 time slots
Support for time slot sizes of 8, 12, 16, 20, 24, 28, and 32 bits
Data formatter for bit manipulation
Individually assignable serial data pins (up to 16 pins)
Glueless connection to audio analog-to-digital converters (ADC), digital-to-analog converters (DAC), Codec, digital audio interface receiver (DIR), and S/PDIF transmit physical layer components.
Wide variety of I2S and similar bit-stream format
Integrated digital audio interface transmitter (DIT) supports:
S/PDIF, IEC60958-1, AES-3 formats
Up to 16 transmit pins
Enhanced channel status/user data RAM
384-slot TDM with external digital audio interface receiver (DIR) device
For DIR reception, an external DIR receiver integrated circuit should be used with I2S output format and connected to the McASP receive section.
Extensive error checking and recovery
Transmit underruns and receiver overruns due to the system not meeting real-time requirements
Early or late frame sync in TDM mode
Out-of-range high-frequency master clock for both transmit and receive
External error signal coming into the AMUTEIN input
DMA error due to incorrect programming

Protocols 

The McASP supports a wide variety of protocols.
Transmit section supports
Wide variety of I2S and similar bit-stream formats
TDM streams from 2 to 32 time slots
S/PDIF, IEC60958-1, AES-3 formats
Receive section supports
Wide variety of I2S and similar bit-stream formats
TDM streams from 2 to 32 time slots
TDM stream of 384 time slots specifically designed for easy interface to external digital interface receiver (DIR) device transmitting DIR frames to McASP using the I2S protocol (one time slot for each DIR subframe)
The transmit and receive sections may each be individually programmed to support the following options
on the basic serial protocol:
Programmable clock and frame sync polarity (rising or falling edge): ACLKR/X, AHCLKR/X and AFSR/X
Slot length (number of bits per time slot): 8, 12, 16, 20, 24, 28, 32 bits supported
Word length (bits per word): 8, 12, 16, 20, 24, 28, 32 bits; always less than or equal to the time slot length
First-bit data delay: 0, 1, 2 bit clocks
Left/right alignment of word inside slot
Bit order: MSB first or LSB first
Bit mask/pad/rotate function
Automatically aligns data for DSP internally in either Q31 or integer formats
Automatically masks nonsignificant bits (sets to 0, 1, or extends value of another bit)
In DIT mode, additional features of the transmitter are:
Transmit-only mode- 384 time slots (subframe) per frame
Bi-phase encoded 3.3 V output
Support for consumer and professional applications
Channel status RAM (384 bits)
User data RAM (384 bits)
Separate valid bit (V) for subframe A, B

See also 
S/PDIF
Biphase mark code (BMC)
Time-division multiplexing (TDM)

References 
Notes

Sources
TMS320C6000 DSP Multichannel Audio Serial Port (McASP) Reference Guide

Texas Instruments hardware
Serial buses